"Algivirga" is a genus from the family of Flammeovirgaceae, with one known species ("Algivirga pacifica").

References

Further reading 
 

Cytophagia
Bacteria genera
Monotypic bacteria genera